Alexander Volkanovski (born 29 September 1988) is an Australian mixed martial artist. He currently competes in the Featherweight division in the Ultimate Fighting Championship (UFC), where he is the current UFC Featherweight Champion. He is also a former Australian Fighting Championship (AFC) Featherweight champion. Prior to his UFC debut, Volkanovski competed as a professional boxer in 2015. As of March 7, 2023, he is #2 in the UFC men's pound-for-pound rankings.

Background 
Volkanovski was born on 29 September 1988, in Wollongong, New South Wales. His father was born in the village of Beranci in SR Macedonia (now North Macedonia) while his mother is from Greece. Alex began training in Greco-Roman wrestling at an early age and won a national title twice at the age of 12. He decided to give up wrestling at the age of 14 and instead focused on a career in rugby league as a front rower. Volkanovski attended Lake Illawarra High School throughout his teenage years and worked as a concreter after graduation.

He played semi-professional rugby league for the Warilla Gorillas in the Group 7 Rugby League where he was awarded the Mick Cronin Medal in 2010 as the league's best player. He also played a crucial role in Warilla's 2011 Premiership winning season and received the Man of the Match award for his performance in his team's Grand Final victory over Gerringong. Volkanovski then decided to quit rugby league at 23 years of age to pursue a professional career in Mixed Martial Arts in the latter half of 2011. He claims to have watched Ultimate Fighting Championship events since childhood and would often rent UFC VHS tapes from Blockbuster as well as purchase UFC pay per views from 14 years of age.

However, he soon realized he had a passion for the sport and wanted to go as far as he could. Volkanovski quickly became a good counter striker with a powerful overhand right as well as a fantastic offensive wrestler. He initially competed in multiple amateur fights in the middleweight division as he adjusted from his rugby weight before turning professional and moving down to welterweight, lightweight and ultimately the featherweight division.

Volkanovski is based at Freestyle Fighting Gym in Wollongong but regularly completes training camps at Tiger Muay Thai in Phuket and City Kickboxing in Auckland with fellow UFC fighters, former UFC Middleweight Champion Israel Adesanya, Dan Hooker and Kai Kara-France. Members of Volkanovski's team have included Eugene Bareman and Craig Jones.

Mixed martial arts career

Early career 
Starting as an amateur at middleweight and going 4–0 before turning professional, Volkanovski has fought in various MMA organizations in the Oceania region in Asia from 2012 to July 2016 before signing with the UFC. He won a Pacific Xtreme Combat (PXC) title and two Australian Fighting Championship (AFC) Featherweight titles. Volkanovski amassed a record of 13–1 with 10 straight wins prior to joining the UFC.

Ultimate Fighting Championship
Volkanovski made his promotional debut on 26 November 2016, and increased his win streak to 11 with a second-round TKO against Yusuke Kasuya at UFC Fight Night 101. He announced at the post-fight press conference that he would drop from lightweight to featherweight for his next fight.

Move down to Featherweight
Volkanovski was expected to face Michel Quiñones on 19 February 2017, at UFC Fight Night 105. However, the bout was scrapped after Quiñones suffered an injury and no replacement could be found.

Volkanovski returned to Featherweight and faced Mizuto Hirota on 11 June 2017, at UFC Fight Night 110. He won the fight via unanimous decision after almost finishing Hirota following a knockdown.

Volkanovski was expected to face Jeremy Kennedy at UFC Fight Night: Werdum vs. Tybura on 19 November 2017, in Sydney, Australia. However, Kennedy pulled out of the fight on 5 October, citing a back injury and was replaced by Humberto Bandenay. In November 2017, it was announced that Bandenay would delay his UFC debut at this event due to undisclosed reasons, and was replaced by Drex Zamboanga. In turn, Zamboanga pulled out of the fight due to visa issues and was replaced by promotional newcomer Shane Young. The bout proceeded at a catchweight of 150 pounds. Volkanovski won the fight via unanimous decision.

The bout with Kennedy was rescheduled and took place on 11 February 2018, at UFC 221. He won the fight via technical knockout.

Volkanovski faced Darren Elkins on 14 July 2018, at UFC Fight Night 133. He won the fight via unanimous decision.

Volkanovski faced Chad Mendes on 29 December 2018, at UFC 232. He won the fight via technical knockout in round two after surviving two knockdowns himself. This fight earned him the Fight of the Night award.

Volkanovski faced former featherweight champion José Aldo at UFC 237 on 11 May 2019. He won the fight via unanimous decision.

UFC Featherweight Champion

Volkanovski vs. Holloway 

Volkanovski faced Max Holloway on 14 December 2019, for the UFC Featherweight Championship at UFC 245. Volkanovski won the fight via unanimous decision.

Volkanovski vs. Holloway II 

Volkanovski made his first title defense in a rematch against Max Holloway on 11 July 2020, at UFC 251. He won the fight via split decision. This outcome was controversial amongst media outlets, with 18 out of 27 media scores giving it to Holloway, mixed martial arts personalities such as UFC president Dana White, former referee and creator of the rules system John McCarthy, and multiple mixed martial artists.

Volkanovski vs. Ortega 

Volkanovski was scheduled to make his second title defense against Brian Ortega on 27 March 2021, at UFC 260. However, the fight was canceled due to COVID-19 protocols.
Volkanovski later tweeted that he tested positive for COVID-19.

On 2 April 2021, it was announced that Brian Ortega and Volkanovski would be the coaches for The Ultimate Fighter 29 at ESPN+ and the show featured bantamweight and middleweight contestants.

Volkanovski faced Brian Ortega on 25 September 2021, at UFC 266 for the UFC Featherweight Championship. He won the fight via unanimous decision. Volkanovski received universal praise for escaping multiple submission attempts and persevering. This fight earned him the Fight of the Night award.

Volkanovski vs. The Korean Zombie 

Volkanovski was scheduled to face Max Holloway for a third time on 5 March 2022, at UFC 272. However, a day after the announcement, Holloway was forced to pull from the event due to injury. Holloway was replaced by Chan Sung Jung and the title bout was moved to UFC 273 on 9 April 2022. After knocking Jung down multiple times, Volkanovski won the fight via TKO in the fourth round. The win earned him the Performance of the Night award. The fight also earned him second place in the Crypto.com "Fan Bonus of the Night" award.

Volkanovski vs. Holloway III 

The trilogy bout against Holloway was rescheduled at UFC 276 on 2 July 2022. Volkanovski won the bout via unanimous decision, with all three judges scoring the fight 50-45. This win earned him the Crypto.com Fan Bonus of the Night second place award which paid in bitcoin of US$20,000.

UFC Lightweight Championship

Volkanovski vs. Makhachev 

Volkanovski faced current UFC Lightweight Champion Islam Makhachev on February 12, 2023 at UFC 284.  He lost the fight via unanimous decision. This fight earned him the Fight of the Night award.

Professional boxing career
Volkanovski has a single boxing bout, which was a Super welterweight bout he won by unanimous decision in four rounds against Dillon Bargero.

Personal life 
Volkanovski is married and has two daughters. He appeared as a coach in Malaysia Invasion, an amateur MMA reality show. Because of his paternal Macedonian and maternal Greek heritage, he uses the nickname "The Great" in reference to Alexander the Great, claiming that he had "a Macedonian father and a Greek mother", similar to himself.

Championships and accomplishments

Mixed martial arts
Ultimate Fighting Championship
 UFC Featherweight Championship (One time, current)
 Four successful title defenses
Fight of the Night (Three times) 
 Performance of the Night (One time) 
 Tied (Arnold Allen) for the second longest win streak in UFC Featherweight division history (10)
 Tied (Max Holloway) for the second most title fight wins in UFC Featherweight division history (5)
 Highest striking differential in UFC Featherweight division history (3.12)
 Longest average fight time in UFC Featherweight division history (18:00)
 UFC Men's Pound-For-Pound No. 1 in 2022
Crypto.com 
Fan Bonus of the Night 
Australian Fighting Championship
Australian Fighting Championship Featherweight Champion (one time; former)
One successful title defense
Cage Conquest
Cage Conquest Welterweight Champion
Pacific Xtreme Combat
PXC Featherweight Champion
Roshambo MMA
Roshambo MMA Lightweight Champion
Roshambo MMA Welterweight Champion
Wollongong Wars
Wollongong Wars Lightweight Champion
CombatPress.com
2019 Breakout Fighter of the Year
World MMA Awards
2019 – July 2020 Upset of the Year vs. Max Holloway at UFC 245
2022 Charles 'Mask' Lewis Fighter of the Year<ref 
2022 International Fighter of the Year
MMAjunkie.com
2021 September Fight of the Month vs. Brian Ortega
ESPN
2021 Fight of the Year vs. Brian Ortega
MMA Mania
2021 Fight of the Year vs. Brian Ortega
MMA Sucka
2021 Fight of the Year vs. Brian Ortega
BT Sport
2022 Fighter of the Year
Cageside Press
2022 Fighter of the Year

Amateur wrestling
Australian National Schools Wrestling Competition
Gold medal - 12/13 yrs 62 kg (2001)

Mixed martial arts record

|-
|Loss
|align=center|25–2
|Islam Makhachev
|Decision (unanimous)
|UFC 284
|
|align=center|5
|align=center|5:00
|Perth, Australia 
|
|-
|Win
|align=center|25–1
|Max Holloway
|Decision (unanimous)
|UFC 276
| 
|align=center|5
|align=center|5:00
|Las Vegas, Nevada, United States
|
|-
|Win
|align=center|24–1
|Jung Chan-sung
|TKO (punches)
|UFC 273
|
|align=center|4
|align=center|0:45
|Jacksonville, Florida, United States
|
|-
|Win
|align=center|23–1
|Brian Ortega
|Decision (unanimous)
|UFC 266
|
|align=center|5
|align=center|5:00
|Las Vegas, Nevada, United States
|
|-
| Win
|align=center|22–1
|Max Holloway
|Decision (split)
|UFC 251
|
|align=center|5
|align=center|5:00
|Abu Dhabi, United Arab Emirates
|
|-
| Win
|align=center|21–1
|Max Holloway
|Decision (unanimous)
|UFC 245
|
|align=center|5
|align=center|5:00
|Las Vegas, Nevada, United States
|
|-
|Win
|align=center|20–1
|José Aldo
|Decision (unanimous)
|UFC 237
|
|align=center|3
|align=center|5:00
|Rio de Janeiro, Brazil
|
|-
|Win
|align=center|19–1
|Chad Mendes
|TKO (punches)
|UFC 232
|
|align=center|2
|align=center|4:14
|Inglewood, California, United States
|
|-
|Win
|align=center|18–1
|Darren Elkins
|Decision (unanimous)
|UFC Fight Night: dos Santos vs. Ivanov
|
|align=center|3
|align=center|5:00
|Boise, Idaho, United States
|
|-
|Win
|align=center|17–1
|Jeremy Kennedy
|TKO (punches and elbows)
|UFC 221
|
|align=center|2
|align=center|4:57
|Perth, Australia
|
|-
|Win
|align=center|16–1
|Shane Young
|Decision (unanimous)
|UFC Fight Night: Werdum vs. Tybura
|
|align=center|3
|align=center|5:00
|Sydney, Australia
|
|-
|Win
|align=center|15–1
|Mizuto Hirota
|Decision (unanimous)
|UFC Fight Night: Lewis vs. Hunt
|
|align=center|3
|align=center|5:00
|Auckland, New Zealand
|
|-
|Win
|align=center|14–1
|Yusuke Kasuya
|TKO (punches)
|UFC Fight Night: Whittaker vs. Brunson
|
|align=center|2
|align=center|2:06
|Melbourne, Australia
|
|-
|Win
|align=center|13–1
|Jai Bradney
|TKO (punches)
|Wollongong Wars 4
|
|align=center|1
|align=center|N/A
|Wollongong, Australia
|
|-
|Win
|align=center|12–1
|Jamie Mullarkey
|KO (punch)
|Australian FC 15
|
|align=center|1
|align=center|3:23
|Melbourne, Australia
|
|-
|Win
|align=center|11–1
|Yusuke Yachi
|Submission (triangle choke)
|Pacific Xtreme Combat 50
|
|align=center|4
|align=center|3:43
|Mangilao, Guam
|
|-
|Win
|align=center|10–1
|James Bishop
|TKO (punches)
|Australian FC 13
|
|align=center|1
|align=center|1:39
|Melbourne, Australia
|
|-
|Win
|align=center|9–1
|David Butt
|TKO (punches)
|Wollongong Wars 2
|
|align=center|2
|align=center|1:52
|Thirroul, Australia
|
|-
|Win
|align=center|8–1
|Kyle Reyes
|Decision (unanimous)
|Pacific Xtreme Combat 45
|
|align=center|3
|align=center|5:00
|Mangilao, Guam
|
|-
|Win
|align=center|7–1
|Jai Bradney
|Submission (rear-naked choke)
|Roshambo MMA 3
|
|align=center|1
|align=center|4:58
|Brisbane, Australia
|
|-
|Win
|align=center|6–1
|Rodolfo Marques Diniz
|KO (punch)
|Australian FC 9
|
|align=center|1
|align=center|3:41
|Albury, Australia
|
|-
|Win
|align=center|5–1
|Greg Atzori
|Submission (guillotine choke)
|Roshambo MMA 2
|
|align=center|1
|align=center|N/A
|Brisbane, Australia
|
|-
|Win
|align=center|4–1
|Luke Catubig
|TKO (punches)
|Australian FC 7
|
|align=center|3
|align=center|4:39
|Melbourne, Australia
|
|-
|Loss
|align=center|3–1
|Corey Nelson
|TKO (head kick and punches)
|Australian FC 5
|
|align=center|3
|align=center|0:13
|Melbourne, Australia
|
|-
|Win
|align=center|3–0
|Anton Zafir
|TKO (punches)
|Roshambo MMA 1
|
|align=center|4
|align=center|2:19
|Brisbane, Australia
|
|-
|Win
|align=center|2–0
|Regan Wilson
|TKO (doctor stoppage)
|Southern Fight Promotions: Cage Conquest 2
|
|align=center|1
|align=center|2:49
|Nowra, Australia
|
|-
|Win
|align=center|1–0
|Gerhard Voigt
|Decision (unanimous)
|Revolution Promotions: Revolution at the Roxy
|
|align=center|3
|align=center|5:00
|Sydney, Australia
|

Professional boxing record

See also
List of current UFC fighters
List of male mixed martial artists

References

External links

  
 

|-

1988 births
Living people
Sportspeople from Wollongong
Sportsmen from New South Wales
Australian male mixed martial artists
Featherweight mixed martial artists
Lightweight mixed martial artists
Welterweight mixed martial artists
Mixed martial artists utilizing Greco-Roman wrestling
Mixed martial artists utilizing boxing
Mixed martial artists utilizing Brazilian jiu-jitsu
Rugby league players from New South Wales
Australian male kickboxers
Australian male sport wrestlers
Australian male boxers
Australian people of Greek descent
Australian people of Macedonian descent
Australian practitioners of Brazilian jiu-jitsu
People awarded a black belt in Brazilian jiu-jitsu
Ultimate Fighting Championship male fighters
Ultimate Fighting Championship champions